Cortina Airport is an abandoned airport located in Cortina d'Ampezzo, Veneto, Italy.

The airport is also known as Cortina d'Ampezzo Airport (full name of the municipality it is located in) and Fiames Airport because it is located in the Fiames frazione.

The airport was built for the 1956 Winter Olympics.  It has remained closed to traffic since an accident involving a Cessna 206 on 31 May 1976. The pilot and all five passengers were killed in a crash immediately after takeoff in difficult wind conditions.

References

Airports in Italy
Buildings and structures in Cortina d'Ampezzo
Transport in Veneto